John William Bosley,  (May 4, 1947 – April 28, 2022) was a Canadian politician. He was best known for having been Speaker of the House of Commons of Canada from November 5, 1984 to September 29, 1986.

Biography 

Bosley received a BA in 1968 from the University of Trinity College in the University of Toronto. Prior to his election to Parliament, he was a businessman. A member of the Progressive Conservative Party of Canada, he was first elected in the 1979 election in the riding of Don Valley West in Toronto. He served as Parliamentary Secretary to Prime Minister Joe Clark.

He was re-elected in the 1980 and 1984 elections. After the 1984 election, he was named Speaker of the House of Commons.

On June 27, 1985, the House adopted changes to the Standing Orders, providing for the election of the Speaker by secret ballot. The first such election took place on September 30, 1986, when Bosley tendered his resignation, and presided over the election of John Fraser as the thirty-second Speaker of the House of Commons.

Bosley was re-elected as a Member of Parliament (MP) in the 1988 election. He ran against incumbent John Fraser in the second election for Speaker but was unsuccessful.

He was defeated in the 1993 general election in which the Progressive Conservative Party was reduced from 157 MPs to two.

Starting in 1993, Bosley served as Advisor on Institutional Development to Parliaments all over the world but primarily in sub-Saharan Africa.

In 2002, Bosley received the Queen Elizabeth II Golden Jubilee Medal and in 2012 the Queen Elizabeth II Diamond Jubilee Medal.

He died from heart failure in Toronto on April 28, 2022, at the age of 74.

References

External links
 

1947 births
2022 deaths
Businesspeople from Toronto
Canadian Anglicans
Members of the House of Commons of Canada from Ontario
Members of the King's Privy Council for Canada
Politicians from Toronto
Progressive Conservative Party of Canada MPs
Speakers of the House of Commons of Canada
Trinity College (Canada) alumni
University of Toronto alumni
Upper Canada College alumni